Ware Place is a Census-designated place located in Greenville County in the U.S. State of South Carolina. According to the 2010 United States Census, the population was 228.

Geography
Ware Place is located at  (34.624718, -82.384822). These coordinates place the CDP on the southwestern side of the county, near the border with Anderson County.

According to the United States Census Bureau, the CDP has a total land area of 0.917 square mile (2.37 km) and a total water area of 0.001  square mile (0.003 km).

Demographics

References

Census-designated places in Greenville County, South Carolina
Census-designated places in South Carolina